Fogwill is a surname. Notable people with the surname include:

Frank Fogwill (1902–1974), Canadian electrician, labour leader and politician
Rodolfo Enrique Fogwill (1941–2010), Argentine short story writer, novelist and businessman
Sarah Fogwill (born 1988), British cricketer
Vera Fogwill (born 1972), Argentine actress, film director and screenplay writer